Julia Davis Adams (July 23, 1900 – January 30, 1993) was an American writer best known for her young adult books, historical and biographical novels and dramas.

Adams was born in Clarksburg, West Virginia, to lawyer and statesman John W. Davis and Julia Leavell McDonald Davis. She attended Wellesley College, and graduated from Barnard College in 1922. She was also an active social worker and a journalist.

Selected works 

 The Swords of the Vikings: Stories from the Works of Saxo Grammaticus (E. P. Dutton, 1928), retold by Davis
 No Other White Men (Dutton, 1937)
 The Shenandoah (Rivers of America, 1945); reprint 2011 West Virginia University Press 
 A Valley and a Song: The Story of the Shenandoah River (Holt, Rinehart and Winston, 1963)
 Harvest: Collected Works of Julia Davis (Jefferson County Oral and Visual History Association, 1992)

Davis wrote two Murray Hill mystery novels, published as by F. Draco:
 Devil's Church (Rinehart, 1951), 
 Cruise with Death (Rinehart, 1952),

References

External links
 
 F. Draco at LC Authorities, with 2 records
 "Julia Davis: A Literary Biography" (archived 2014-12-16) – with bibliography; this may be the introduction to Harvest: Collected Works (1992), 

1900 births
1993 deaths
American historical novelists
American children's writers
Newbery Honor winners
Writers from Clarksburg, West Virginia
Barnard College alumni
Wellesley College alumni
Novelists from West Virginia
Place of death missing
20th-century American novelists
American social workers